Richard Bailey may refer to:
Richard Bailey (historian), historian of African American history in Alabama
 Richard Bailey (photographer), Australian fashion photographer; see List of Vogue (US) cover models
 Richard Eugene Bailey, creator of Hughes Television Network in 1956
 Richard W. Bailey (1939–2011), American linguist
 Richard William Bailey (1885–1957), British mechanical engineer and research engineer
 Richard Bailey, convicted for a series of horse killings and involvement in the murder of heiress Helen Brach
 Richard Bailey, keyboardist with the band Trapeze
 Richard Bailey, mayor of Coronado, California
 Richard Bailey, a.k.a. Richie Kirsch, a recurring antagonist in the Scream franchise portrayed by Jack Quaid

See also
 Bill Bailey (disambiguation)